The Norinco NZ-85B is a Chinese copy of the Czech pistol, the CZ 85, which was an improved version of the legendary Czech pistol, the CZ 75.

Design
The pistol design is based on the Czech CZ 85, specifically the CZ 85B, which is a modernization of the old CZ 85. It has a firing pin block safety (which grants more safety to the user than the old manual safety, similar to that of the Browning Hi-Power, which did not decock the hammer), squared off trigger guard (for better handling of the weapon), a ring hammer (for easy cocking and decocking of the hammer), and tri-dot sights (for better aiming capabilities than the old system of front blade and a rear square notch).

The CZ 85 itself is also a modernized and upgraded version of the CZ 75 itself. The NZ-85B also has some improvements over its original gun.

The NZ 85B, like a lot of Chinese copies of guns, has a heavy duty forged (not cast) steel frame and slide, what makes it one of the most solid, robust self-loading pistols on the market. Unlike cast steel, forged steel is made with strength and toughness in mind.

It has a chrome-lined barrel to extend the barrel life, make it easier to clean, and protect it better from corrosion and erosion than a non-chromed barrel. Because it's a handgun, one doesn't need to worry about the little difference of accuracy between a chromed and a non-chromed barrel (which has better accuracy).

The gun has a slide-mounted safety/decocker, which makes it slightly more safe than other types of safeties or decockers, because when the safety is engaged, it also decocks the hammer, preventing any kind of accidental discharges. The NZ-85B has a double-action trigger. With this system, one can shoot the gun with the hammer cocked or decocked.

This gun has a ten-round double column magazine, similar to that of the Browning Hi-Power, which was one of the first guns to ever adopt the double column magazine.

The gun's frame has blue finished steel and it has a plastic grip that can easily be replaced by taking out a couple of screws.

In addition to all these common stats of Chinese copied guns, the NZ 85B also has slide rails in the inside rather than the outside of the frame, a system said to increase accuracy and smooth operation.

References

9mm Parabellum semi-automatic pistols
Semi-automatic pistols of the People's Republic of China
Norinco